Duke of Longueville (Longueville-sur-Scie) was a title of French nobility, though not a peerage of France.

History

The title was created in 1505 by King Louis XII of France for his first cousin once removed, François d'Orléans, Count of Dunois, son of François d'Orléans, Count of Dunois, son of Jean d'Orléans, himself an illegitimate son of the Duke of Orléans. The title became extinct in 1694, following the death of Jean Louis Charles d'Orléans, who was the brother of Marie de Nemours.

From 1648, the Duke of Longueville was also Sovereign Prince of Neuchâtel, a Swiss territory. In 1654, the eighth duke was created a peer as Duke of Coulommiers, but the peerage was never registered and so became extinct at his death.

Dukes of Longueville
 François II (1478–1513).
 Louis I (1480–1516), brother of the preceding.
 Claude (1508–1524), son of the preceding.
 Louis II (1510–1537), brother of the preceding.
 François III (1535–1551), son of the preceding.
 Léonor (1540–1573), first cousin of the preceding.
 Henri I (1568–1595), son of the preceding.
 Henri II (1595–1663), son of the preceding.
 Jean Louis Charles (1646–1694), son of the preceding. He resigned the title to his brother in 1668.
 Charles Paris (1649–1672), brother of the preceding. On his death, the title went back to his brother.
 Jean Louis Charles (1646–1694).

Other members of the family

 Jean d'Orléans, brother of the first and second dukes.
 Marie of Lorraine ("Mary of Guise"), wife of the fourth duke.
 Jacqueline de Rohan, mother of the sixth duke.
 Françoise d'Orléans, Princess of Condé, sister of the sixth duke.
 the Dukes of Fronsac, descended from the sixth duke.
 Louise de Bourbon and Anne Geneviève de Bourbon, wives of the eighth duke.
 Marie de Nemours, daughter of the eighth and sister of the ninth and tenth dukes.
 Charles d'Orléans de Rothelin, descended from an illegitimate half-brother of the sixth duke.
Princess Charlotte Louise de Rohan wife of Louis Antoine, Duke of Enghien

References

 http://www.heraldica.org/topics/france/peerage2.htm
 
 http://www.worldstatesmen.org/Swiss_Cantons2.html#Neuchatel

Dukes of Longueville
House of Valois